Antanas Karoblis (August 17, 1940 – June 19, 2007) was a Lithuanian politician.  In 1990 he was among those who signed the Act of the Re-Establishment of the State of Lithuania.

References

1940 births
2007 deaths
Lithuanian politicians